Rabin Banikya (died 11 November 2022) was an Indian politician from Asom Gana Parishad politician from Assam. He was elected in Assam Legislative Assembly election in 1996 and 2006 for the Abhayapuri South constituency.

References 

Year of birth missing
20th-century births
2022 deaths
Asom Gana Parishad politicians
Assam MLAs 2016–2021
People from Bongaigaon district